The Chlamydiota (synonym Chlamydiae) are a bacterial phylum and class whose members are remarkably diverse, including pathogens of humans and animals, symbionts of ubiquitous protozoa, and marine sediment forms not yet well understood. All of the Chlamydiota that humans have known about for many decades are obligate intracellular bacteria; in 2020 many additional Chlamydiota were discovered in ocean-floor environments, and it is not yet known whether they all have hosts. Historically it was believed that all Chlamydiota had a peptidoglycan-free cell wall, but studies in the 2010s demonstrated a detectable presence of peptidoglycan, as well as other important proteins. 

Among the Chlamydiota, all of the ones long known to science grow only by infecting eukaryotic host cells. They are as small as or smaller than many viruses. They are ovoid in shape and stain Gram-negative. They are dependent on replication inside the host cells; thus, some species are termed obligate intracellular pathogens and others are symbionts of ubiquitous protozoa. Most intracellular Chlamydiota are located in an inclusion body or vacuole. Outside cells, they survive only as an extracellular infectious form. These Chlamydiota can grow only where their host cells grow, and develop according to a characteristic biphasic developmental cycle. Therefore, clinically relevant Chlamydiota cannot be propagated in bacterial culture media in the clinical laboratory. They are most successfully isolated while still inside their host cells. 

Of various Chlamydiota that cause human disease, the two most important species are Chlamydia pneumoniae, which causes a type of pneumonia, and Chlamydia trachomatis, which causes chlamydia. Chlamydia is the most common bacterial sexually transmitted infection in the United States, and 2.86 million chlamydia infections are reported annually.

History 

Chlamydia-like disease affecting the eyes of people was first described in ancient Chinese and Egyptian manuscripts.  A modern description of chlamydia-like organisms was provided by Halberstaedrrter and von Prowazek in 1907.  Chlamydial isolates cultured in the yolk sacs of embryonating eggs were obtained from a human pneumonitis outbreak in the late 1920s and early 1930s, and by the mid-20th century, isolates had been obtained from dozens of vertebrate species.  The term chlamydia (a cloak) appeared in the literature in 1945, although other names continued to be used, including Bedsonia, Miyagawanella, ornithosis-, TRIC-, and PLT-agents. In 1956, Chlamydia trachomatis was first cultured by Tang Fei-fan, though they were not yet recognized as bacteria.

Nomenclature 

In 1966, Chlamydiota were recognized as bacteria and the genus Chlamydia was validated. The order Chlamydiales was created by Storz and Page in 1971. The class Chlamydiia was  recently validly published.  Between 1989 and 1999, new families, genera, and species were recognized.  The phylum Chlamydiae was established in Bergey's Manual of Systematic Bacteriology. By 2006, genetic data for over 350 chlamydial lineages had been reported. Discovery of ocean-floor forms reported in 2020 involves new clades. In 2022 the phylum was renamed Chlamydiota.

Taxonomy and molecular signatures

The Chlamydiota currently contain eight validly named genera, and 14  genera. The phylum presently consist of two orders (Chlamydiales, Parachlamydiales) and nine families within a single class (Chlamydiia). Only four of these families are validly named (Chlamydiaceae, Parachlamydiaceae, Simkaniaceae, Waddliaceae) while five are described as  families (Clavichlamydiaceae, Criblamydiaceae, Parilichlamydiaceae, Piscichlamydiaceae, and Rhabdochlamydiaceae).
The Chlamydiales order as recently described contains the families Chlamydiaceae, and the Clavichlamydiaceae, while the new Parachlamydiales order harbors the remaining seven families. This proposal is supported by the observation of two distinct phylogenetic clades that warrant taxonomic ranks above the family level. Molecular signatures in the form of conserved indels (CSIs) and proteins (CSPs) have been found to be uniquely shared by each separate order, providing a means of distinguishing each clade from the other and supporting the view of shared ancestry of the families within each order. The distinctness of the two orders is also supported by the fact that no CSIs were found among any other combination of families.

Molecular signatures have also been found that are exclusive for the family Chlamydiaceae. The Chlamydiaceae originally consisted of one genus, Chlamydia, but in 1999 was split into two genera, Chlamydophila and Chlamydia. The genera have since 2015 been reunited where species belonging to the genus Chlamydophila have been reclassified as Chlamydia species. However, CSIs and CSPs have been found specifically for Chlamydophila species, supporting their distinctness from Chlamydia, perhaps warranting additional consideration of two separate groupings within the family.  CSIs and CSPs have also been found that are exclusively shared by all Chlamydia that are further indicative of a lineage independent from Chlamydophila, supporting a means to distinguish Chlamydia species from neighbouring Chlamydophila members.

Phylogenetics

The  Chlamydiota form a unique bacterial evolutionary group that separated from other bacteria about a billion years ago, and can be distinguished by the presence of several CSIs and CSPs. The species from this group can be distinguished from all other bacteria by the presence of conserved indels in a number of proteins and by large numbers of signature proteins that are uniquely present in different Chlamydiae species.  Reports have varied as to whether the Chlamydiota are related to the Planctomycetota or Spirochaetota. Genome sequencing, however, indicates that 11% of the genes in Protochlamydia amoebophila UWE25 and 4% in  the Chlamydiaceae are most similar to chloroplast, plant, and cyanobacterial genes. Cavalier-Smith has postulated that the Chlamydiota fall into the clade Planctobacteria in the larger clade Gracilicutes. However, phylogeny and shared presence of CSIs in proteins that are lineage-specific indicate that  the Verrucomicrobiota are the closest free-living relatives of these parasitic organisms. Comparison of ribosomal RNA genes has provided a phylogeny of known strains within Chlamydiota.

Human pathogens and diagnostics

Three species of Chlamydiota that commonly infect humans are described:
 Chlamydia trachomatis, which causes the eye-disease trachoma and the sexually transmitted infection chlamydia
 Chlamydophila pneumoniae, which causes a form of pneumonia
 Chlamydophila psittaci, which causes psittacosis

The unique physiological status of the Chlamydiota including their biphasic lifecycle and obligation to replicate within a eukaryotic host has enabled the use of DNA analysis for chlamydial diagnostics. Horizontal transfer of genes is evident and complicates this area of research. In one extreme example, two genes encoding histone-like H1 proteins of eukaryotic origin have been found in the prokaryotic genome of C. trachomatis, an obligate intracellular pathogen.

Phylogeny

Taxonomy
The currently accepted taxonomy is based on the List of Prokaryotic names with Standing in Nomenclature (LPSN) and National Center for Biotechnology Information (NCBI)

 Family ?"Piscichlamydiaceae" Horn 2010
 "Ca. Piscichlamydia Draghi et al. 2004
 Family "Parilichlamydiaceae" Stride et al. 2013
 ?"Ca. Panilichlamydia" Sood et al. 2019
 ?"Ca. Parilichlamydia" Stride et al. 2013
 "Ca. Similichlamydia" Stride et al. 2013
 Order Chlamydiales Storz & Page 1971
 Family "Actinochlamydiaceae" Steigen et al. 2013
 Family "Clavichlamydiaceae" Horn 2011
 Family "Criblamydiaceae" Thomas, Casson & Greub 2006
 Family Chlamydiaceae Rake 1957
 Family Parachlamydiaceae Everett, Bush & Andersen 1999
 Family Rhabdochlamydiaceae Corsaro et al. 2009
 Family Simkaniaceae Everett, Bush & Andersen 1999
 Family Waddliaceae Rurangirwa et al. 1999

See also
 List of bacterial orders
 List of bacteria genera

References

External links 
 
 Chlamydia Overview 

 
Bacteria phyla
Monotypic bacteria taxa